Ragged Mountain ( above sea level) is a low mountain with numerous knobby summits in the towns of Danbury and Andover in central New Hampshire.  It is home to the Ragged Mountain ski resort.

Geography
In his book, The History of the Town of Andover, John R. Eastman describes Ragged Mountain as a "truly ragged pile of ledge and boulder, crag and cliff, hill and ravine." An east–west running, detached mountain, Ragged Mountain contains two prominent peaks separated by a shallow notch.

The Bulkhead, a  granite cliff, juts out on the east end of Ragged Mountain. A seldom-used rock climbing destination, The Bulkhead is also the last place peregrine falcons have nested in the Sunapee-Kearsarge region of New Hampshire. The Bulkhead can be reached from The Bulkhead Trail at the headwaters of Mitchell Brook on Proctor Academy's campus. From the Andover town green, the hike takes roughly an hour and twenty minutes.

The trailheads are at Proctor Academy on NH Route 11 in Andover and, on the northern side, on New Canada Road in Danbury.

Hydrology
The northern side of Ragged Mountain drains into the Smith River via Bog Brook. The western, southern, and eastern sides of the mountain drain into the Blackwater River. The entire mountain is situated within the Merrimack River watershed, which empties into the Gulf of Maine (Atlantic Ocean) near Newburyport, Massachusetts.

Water bodies around the base of the mountain are (listed counter-clockwise, starting to the west) Eagle Pond, Cold Pond, Hopkins Pond, Elbow Pond, and Bog Pond.

Gallery

Notes

External links

 SRK Greenway - Ragged Mountain map
  Ragged Mountain - FranklinSites.com Hiking Guide
  Peakbagger.com: Ragged Mountain, New Hampshire
 Proctor Academy
 

Mountains of New Hampshire
Mountains of Merrimack County, New Hampshire
Andover, New Hampshire
Danbury, New Hampshire